Naked Vegas is an American reality show about a body painting business owned by Red Belmonte in Las Vegas, Nevada.

Cast 
 Kelly "Red" Belmonte
 Nix Herrera
 Heather Aguilera
 Suzanne Lugano
 Wiser Oner
 Drew Marvick
 Dan Madonia

Episodes 
 "Paint the Town, Red"
 "Devil Pirates and Aliens"
 "Penn & Teller Painted Magic"
 "Painted Playmate Claire Sinclair"
 "Cosplay and Steampunk"
 "Jabbawockeez Masked in Color"

Reception 
 Las Vegas Review Journal
 Variety

References

External links 
 
 

2013 American television series debuts
2013 American television series endings
2010s American reality television series
Syfy original programming
Television shows set in Las Vegas